Odogbolu is a Local Government Area in Ogun State, Nigeria.

It has an area of 541 km and a population of 127,123 at the 2006 census.

The postal code of the area is 120.

Oladipo Diya, the de facto Vice President of Nigeria during the Sani Abacha military junta from 1994, was born in Odogbolu.

The King is called Alaye of Odogbolu, in the person of Oba Adedeji Olusegun Onagoruwa

References

Local Government Areas in Ogun State
Local Government Areas in Yorubaland